The Austin Rocks are a group of rocks which extend about  in a northeast–southwest, lying in Bransfield Strait  northwest of Trinity Island. Charted by a British expedition, 1828–31, under Commander Henry Foster, Royal Navy, they were named by him for Lieutenant Horatio T. Austin, Royal Navy, an officer of the expedition.

References
 

Rock formations of the Palmer Archipelago
Trinity Island